Valley National Bank or Valley National Bank Building may refer to:

Valley National Bank of New Jersey, a banking organization founded in 1927
Valley National Bank of Arizona, a defunct banking organization founded in 1900
 Valley National Bank (Casa Grande, Arizona), listed on the NRHP in Pinal County, Arizona
 Valley National Bank Building (Tucson, Arizona), listed on the NRHP in Arizona
Montezuma Valley National Bank and Store Building, Cortez, CO, listed on the NRHP in Colorado
Arkansas Valley National Bank, Pawnee, OK, listed on the NRHP in Oklahoma